Dr. Duanqing Pei is a research scientist who specializes in regenerative medicine.

Originally from a small agricultural college in southern China, Dr. Pei went on to complete his graduate work at and obtained his PhD from the University of Pennsylvania in 1991. He then became a postdoctoral fellow at the University of Michigan before becoming a faculty member at the University of Minnesota School of Medicine in 1996. He joined the medical faculty at Tsinghua University in Beijing, China in 2002 and became the head of the pharmacology department soon after. In 2004, Dr. Pei moved to the newly formed Guangzhou Institute of Biomedicine and Health and took on the position of Deputy Director General. In the spring of 2009, he was promoted to Director General.

Dr. Pei's most notable work is the discovery of vitamin C's effect on the induction of pluripotent stem cells by around 100–1000 fold. He is currently the director of the Guangzhou Institute of Biomedicine and Health.

References

External links
 http://www.scientificamerican.com/article.cfm?id=induced-pluripotent-stem-cells-ips-vitamin-c-antioxidant

Stem cell researchers
Living people
University of Michigan alumni
Year of birth missing (living people)
Members of the European Molecular Biology Organization